The Kazakh Wikipedia (Kazakh Cyrillic: , Latin: ,) is the Kazakh language edition of the free online encyclopedia Wikipedia, founded on 2 June 2002.

History

The Kazakh Wikipedia started in June 2002. The Kazakh Wikipedia had a very high growth rate in 2011, going from 7,000 articles to over 100,000 in less than one year, largely due to the incorporation of materials from the Kazakh Encyclopedia, which have been released under a Creative Commons Attribution Share-Alike License (CC BY-SA). This rapid expansion was initiated by the non-profit Wikibilim Foundation. The Samruk Kazyna Foundation, Kazakhstan's sovereign oil wealth fund, sponsored the expansion, with 30 million tenge spent in 2011 for paid editing, digitalization, and author rights transfer. At the Wikimania 2011 conference WikiBilim president Rauan Kenzhekhanuly was awarded the Wikipedian of the Year award by Wikipedia co-founder Jimmy Wales for his work on the Kazakh Wikipedia expansion.

In April 2012 Tengri News reported that "in 2011, the Samruk Kazyna sovereign wealth fund allocated a total of $204 thousand to develop the Kazakh-language Wikipedia. This year, another $136 thousand will be earmarked", citing the Fund's Press Service. Wales thanked the Kazakh government for its support of the Kazakh Wikipedia at Wikimania 2012.

The Kazakh Wikipedia can be viewed and written in three different scripts: Cyrillic, Latin, and Arabic. On 26 October 2011, it passed the 100,000 articles threshold, and by early 2013 had just over 200,000 articles.

Features
The Kazakh Wikipedia uses ZhengZhu's character mapping program to convert between Cyrillic, Latin, and Arabic scripts. While its Latin script utilizes Kazinform's own romanization system.

Controversies
Questions have been asked about WikiBilim's closeness to the Kazakh government, given that WikiBilim president Rauan Kenzhekhanuly had a long prior career as a Kazakh government official and the government has been widely criticised for its crackdown on free speech. Wikipedia co-founder Jimmy Wales' friendship with ex-British Prime Minister Tony Blair, who advises the Kazakh government, has also come under scrutiny, as has the neutrality of the Kazakh Wikipedia's content, much of which is a reproduction of the state-published national encyclopedia.

In 2015, Jimmy Wales stated on Reddit that at the time he gave Kenzhekhanuly the inaugural Wikipedian of the Year award, he'd been unaware of Kenzhekhanuly's prior positions as first secretary at Kazakhstan's embassy in Moscow and as an adviser to the governor of Kazakhstan's Mangystau region; by 2015, Kenzhekhanuly had gone on to become deputy governor of Kazakhstan's Kyzylorda region and founding director of Eurasian Council on Foreign Affairs, a think-tank funded by the Kazakh government.

Statistics
The overwhelming majority of its readers originate from Kazakhstan.

As of April 2013, the Kazakh Wikipedia's number of articles accounts for approximately 14% of all the articles written in a Turkic language, making it the second largest edition in the family after Turkish, which accounts for 28% of all Turkic articles.

Gallery

References

Sources 
 Lih, Andrew. The Wikipedia Revolution: How a Bunch of Nobodies Created the World's Greatest Encyclopedia. Hyperion, New York City. 2009. First Edition.  (alkaline paper).

External links 

 
  Kazakh Wikipedia
  Kazakh Wikipedia mobile version
 WikiBilim: About Foundation
 Wikimedia Community of Kazakh language User Group 27 March 2020

Wikipedias by language
Kazakh-language mass media
Internet properties established in 2002
Internet in Kazakhstan
Science and technology in Kazakhstan
Kazakh encyclopedias